An aviary is a large enclosure for confining birds, although bats may also be considered for display. Unlike birdcages, aviaries allow birds a larger living space where they can fly; hence, aviaries are also sometimes known as flight cages. Aviaries often contain plants and shrubbery to simulate a natural environment.

Various types of aviary
Large aviaries are often found in the setting of a zoological garden (for example, the London Zoo, the National Zoo in Washington, D.C., and the San Diego Zoo). Walk-in aviaries also exist in bird parks, including the spacious Jurong BirdPark in Singapore, or the smaller Edward Youde Aviary in Hong Kong. Pittsburgh is home to the USA's National Aviary, perhaps the most prominent example in North America of an aviary not set inside a zoo. However, the oldest public aviary not set inside a zoo in North America, the Hamilton Aviary is located in Hamilton, Ontario, Canada. Tracy Aviary is an example of a bird park within a public urban park, Liberty Park in Salt Lake City, Utah. Some smaller sized aviaries can often be found in European manorial gardens, such as Waddesdon Manor, UK, and Versailles, France. Some public aquaria, such as the Oregon Coast Aquarium, Newport, Oregon, or the Monterey Bay Aquarium, have aquatic aviaries.

Home aviaries are popular with some bird fanciers who have the space for them. Many bird breeders list themselves as "aviaries", since most bird pairs breed best in aviaries in contrast to breeding cages. Home aviaries may be built by the owner or obtained from a commercial supplier.

There are two main subcategories of home aviaries: grounded aviaries and suspended aviaries. Grounded aviaries are affixed to the ground with a concrete base to prevent rats and other vermin from entering. Suspended aviaries are suspended in the air with only the 'legs' of the aviaries affixed to the ground; hence, the need for a protective base is eliminated in suspended aviaries. Most grounded aviaries typically feature a woodwork or PVC frame unlike the metal frame of public aviaries; however, it isn't uncommon for suspended aviaries to feature a metal frame.
Aviaries are also used for research purposes in ornithology institutes.

History

Early modern origins 
An aviary, a large cage to house and display birds, dates as far back and possibly earlier than the 1500s found in the Aztec city of Tenochtitlan as noted by Hernán Cortés when he and his men arrived in 1521. Also the Raven Cage (created in 1829), is regarded as one of the oldest structures in the London Zoo.

Victorian revival 
The first large aviary inside a zoological garden was established in 1880 in the setting of the Rotterdam Zoo. Aviaries were an important aspect for the many Rothschild houses that proliferated across Europe in the 19th century. This was a recalling of the aristocratic custom from the late 1600s, which involved the elite society displaying their power, status and wealth through the exhibition of exotic birds and animals. For instance, Baron Ferdinand de Rothschild built his aviary in 1889 at Waddesdon Manor, UK, erected in the style of Versailles' trelliswork pavilions.

20th century to modern day 
In 1902, a flying cage was completed in the setting of the National Zoological Park of the Smithsonian Institution. A new Great Flying Cage was built in 1964.

The Saint Louis Zoo is home to the 1904 World's Fair Flight Cage. It is one of only two permanent structures built for the World's Fair which still remain (the other is the Saint Louis Art Museum's Cass Gilbert building). In 1904, it was the largest bird cage ever built. It remains one of the world's largest free-flight aviaries. Local pride in the giant cage motivated St. Louis to finally establish a zoo in 1910.

In 1937, the San Diego Zoo's aviary designed by architect Louis John Gill opened; it was then the largest in the world.

With the Antwerp cage system (1948), birds are only separate from public with a light system used indoor the Bird Building at Antwerp Zoo.

At the Frankfurt Zoo, the bird house was built in 1969. Its Bird Halls presented birds for the first time in large glassed miniature habitats. In diving exhibits, darters and kingfishers could be seen hunting under water, and in the free-flight hall visitors still walk amongst tropical birds in dense vegetation.
In 1963, the same principle was used outdoors to construct the Bird Thicket, ten aviaries surrounded by dense bushes and designed in various habitat settings, which visitors can enter through wire netted doors and curtains of cords.

The Snowdon Aviary in London Zoo was designed by Antony Armstrong-Jones, 1st Earl of Snowdon, Cedric Price and Frank Newby, and built in 1962–1964.

The Bronx Zoo's World of Birds, a two-story bird house completed in 1972, is a huge, landscaped, indoor free-flight exhibit. The one-way flow pattern in the exhibit moves the visitors through twenty-five birds habitats, ranging from desert to tropical forest. Each setting recreates with impressive fidelity the microculture of the birds that fly merrily about within their diorama world, complete with living plants. Five of the aviaries are completely open: in two of the largest the uncaged public walks through the habitat with birds freely overhead.

The Henry Doorly Zoo's Simmons Aviary opened in 1983 and is one of the world's largest free-flight aviaries. About 500 birds from all parts of the world occupy the area of the aviary. In this  exhibit, visitors see flamingos, ducks, swans, storks, cranes, spoonbills, ibis and egrets. The structure of two-inch nylon mesh is supported by a system of cables and poles. The use of nylon instead of wire is a unique concept.

Birds of Eden bird sanctuary, located in the Western Cape of South Africa, is possibly the largest free flight aviary in the world. It is home to around 3,000 individual birds from 200 species.

List of public aviaries

 Hamilton Aviary, Hamilton, Ontario, Canada
 Bird Kingdom, Niagara Falls, Ontario, Canada
 Birds of Eden, Western Cape, South Africa
 Bloedel Floral Conservatory, Vancouver, British Columbia, Canada
 Butterfly World, Coconut Creek, Florida, United States
 Clissold Park, Hackney, United Kingdom
 Edward Youde Aviary, Hong Kong, China
 Flamingo Gardens, Davie, Florida, United States
 Flying High Bird Sanctuary, Apple Tree Creek, Australia
 Jurong Bird Park, Jurong, Singapore
 Kobe Kachoen, Kobe, Japan
 Kuala Lumpur Bird Park, Kuala Lumpur, Malaysia
 Living Coasts, Torquay, Devon, United Kingdom
 Melaka Bird Park, Melaka, Malaysia
 National Aviary, Pittsburgh, Pennsylvania, United States
 Turtle Back Zoo, New Jersey, United States
 Miami Metro Zoo, Florida, United States
 Palmitos Park, Canary islands, Spain
 Parque das Aves, Foz do Iguaçu, Brazil
 Snowdon Aviary, London, United Kingdom
 Tracy Aviary, Salt Lake City, Utah, United States
 Voliere Zürich, Enge (Zürich), Switzerland
 Waddesdon Manor's Aviary, United Kingdom
 Weltvogelpark Walsrode, Germany
 Shukavana  mysuru, India
 Bird Garden of Isfahan Iran
 Bioparco di Roma, Rome, Italy

Gallery

References

External links

 Waddesdon Manor's Aviary, YouTube video
 1904 Flight Cage
 1926 Scripps Aviary, San Diego Zoo
 Birds of Eden, a  aviary in South Africa
 Tracy Aviary

 
Aviculture
Buildings and structures used to confine animals
Bird parks